The 1948 Montana gubernatorial election took place on November 2, 1948. Incumbent Governor of Montana Sam C. Ford, who was first elected Governor in 1940 and was re-elected in 1944, ran for re-election. He won the Republican primary and advanced to the general election, where he faced John W. Bonner, the former Attorney General of Montana and the Democratic nominee. Ultimately, Bonner defeated Ford handily in his bid for re-election, winning his first and only term as governor.

Democratic primary

Candidates
John W. Bonner, former Attorney General of Montana
Arthur F. Lamey, former chairman of the Montana Democratic Party
Leif Erickson, former Chief Justice of the Montana Supreme Court, 1946 Democratic nominee for the United States Senate, 1944 Democratic nominee for Governor of Montana
Vernon Hoven
George M. Melton

Results

Republican primary

Candidates
Sam C. Ford, incumbent Governor of Montana
Leonard C. Young
Mike Kuchera, furniture dealer

Results

General election

Results

References

Montana
Gubernatorial
1948
November 1948 events in the United States